Surliyadin (born August 19, 1990), is an Indonesian professional basketball player.  He currently plays for the Garuda Bandung club of the Indonesian Basketball League.

He represented Indonesia's national basketball team at the 2016 SEABA Cup, where he recorded most minutes, points, assists and steals for his team.

References

External links
 Indonesian Basketball League profile
 Asia-basket.com profile
 NBL Indonesia profile

Videos
 Surliyadin - Speedy NBL Indonesia Highlight Reel Video on youtube.com

1990 births
Living people
Indonesian men's basketball players
Small forwards
Sportspeople from Bandung
Competitors at the 2019 Southeast Asian Games
Southeast Asian Games silver medalists for Indonesia
Southeast Asian Games medalists in 3x3 basketball